Polebrook Farm is a  biological Site of Special Scientific Interest south of Sevenoaks in Kent, England.

The field layout of this farm is believed to have remained unchanged for over 700 years. The hedges and meadows have a rich variety of flora, with at least 19 species of grasses.

A public footpath crosses the site.

References

Sites of Special Scientific Interest in Kent